Pearse O'Neill (born 1 December 1979) is an Irish sportsperson.  He plays Gaelic football with his local club Aghada and was a member of the Cork senior inter-county team between 2006 and 2013, when he announced his retirement from inter-county football.

References

1979 births
Living people
Aghada Gaelic footballers
Cork inter-county Gaelic footballers
Munster inter-provincial Gaelic footballers
Irish international rules football players
Winners of one All-Ireland medal (Gaelic football)